Seeed may refer to:

 Seeed, a music band from Germany
 Seeed Studio, a Chinese company specializing in computer hardware manufacturing

See also 

 SEEEED, a region of the CCDC47 protein
 Seed (disambiguation)
 Sed (disambiguation)